Kristie Hyerim Ahn (born June 15, 1992) is an American former professional tennis player.

She has won seven singles titles and two doubles titles on the ITF Circuit. On 30 September 2019, she reached her best singles ranking of world No. 87. Her first appearance at a Grand Slam tournament was at the age of 16 at the 2008 US Open. In 2019, she was given a wildcard bid and reached the fourth round of the US Open where she became the first Asian American woman to make the round of 16 at a Grand Slam tournament since Lilia Osterloh accomplished the feat in 2000.

Ahn is of Korean descent and was born in Flushing Hospital, having later lived in Englewood Cliffs, N.J. She graduated from Stanford University in 2014 with a degree in Science, Technology and Society. She played on the Stanford women's tennis team from 2010 to 2014 and was All-American in singles, ITA National Rookie of the Year, and Pac-10 Championships singles champion.

Performance timelines

Only main-draw results in WTA Tour, Grand Slam tournaments, Fed Cup/Billie Jean King Cup and Olympic Games are included in win–loss records.

Singles

ITF Circuit finals

Singles: 13 (7 titles, 6 runner–ups)

Doubles: 6 (2 titles, 4 runner–ups)

Notes

References

External links
 
 

1992 births
Living people
American female tennis players
American sportspeople of Korean descent
People from Upper Saddle River, New Jersey
Sportspeople from Bergen County, New Jersey
Tennis people from New Jersey
Korean-American tennis players
Stanford Cardinal women's tennis players